What Price Innocence? (Italian: Gli Innocenti pagano) is a 1952 Italian melodrama film directed by Luigi Capuano and starring Lída Baarová, Otello Toso and Mariella Lotti.  The film's sets were designed by the art directors Peppino Piccolo and Gino Brosio.

Cast
Lída Baarová as 	Adriana Sereni
Otello Toso as 		Stefano Rella
Mino Doro as 	 Giovanni
Mariella Lotti as 	 	Elena Artesi
Carlo Romano as 	Don Settimio
Ignazio Balsamo as 	Giovanni
Paola Quattrini as 	Ada
 Giovanni Grasso as Suocero di Stefano
 Margherita Bossi as Rosaria 
 Bella Starace Sainati as Domestica di Adriana
 Claudio Ermelli as Invitato alla festa di Artesi
 Agostino Salvietti as 	Contadino 
 Gigi Pisano as Bufalaro cantante
 Giovanni Petrucci as 	Cacciatore

References

Bibliography
 Bayman, Louis. The Operatic and the Everyday in Postwar Italian Film Melodrama. Edinburgh University Press, 2014.
 Chiti, Roberto & Poppi, Roberto. Dizionario del cinema italiano: Dal 1945 al 1959. Gremese Editore, 1991.

External links 
 

1952 films
1950s Italian-language films
Italian drama films
1952 drama films
Italian black-and-white films
Melodrama films
1950s Italian films